Tayeb Filali (born 16 January 1979) is an Algerian long-distance runner. At the 2012 Summer Olympics, he competed in the Men's marathon, but did not finish.

References

Algerian male long-distance runners
Algerian male marathon runners
1979 births
Living people
People from Mila Province
Olympic athletes of Algeria
Athletes (track and field) at the 2012 Summer Olympics
World Athletics Championships athletes for Algeria
21st-century Algerian people
20th-century Algerian people